Alex Harris may refer to:

 Alex Harris (swimmer) (1975–2009), Australian Paralympic swimmer
 Alex Harris (basketball) (born 1986), American basketball player
 Alex Harris (footballer) (born 1994), Scottish footballer
 Alex Tobiasson Harris, Swedish Muay Thai kickboxer

See also
 Al Harris (disambiguation)
 Alexander Harris (disambiguation)